Belorussian Station is a 1971 Soviet drama film directed by Andrei Smirnov.

Plot
25 years after the end of Great Patriotic War four comrades-in-arms attend the funeral of their friend. He was the only one of them who stayed in the military and rose to the rank of colonel. The rest of them turned to civil professions: locksmith, journalist, accountant and director of the plant.

Being gathered together due to tragic circumstances,  during one day they suddenly fall into a variety of situations – both comic and tragic ones. But in each case friends are united by friendship, generosity and willingness to act according to justice, no matter what ...

That difficult day friends complete with a visit to their friend, the former front-line nurse. She sings a lyrical song of the war years, and they cry from the flood of memories as they think back 25 years ago, May 1945, when all of them were alive, young and happy of their victory ...

Writing and filming
The original script written in 1966 by Vadim Trunin was significantly different from the final one shot in the film. According to that scenario, young people at the restaurant began to mock the four front-line friends, and it came to a fight. The former paratroopers easily come out of it victorious, but the called police took the side of young people (one of them had influential parents). The police tried to arrest the four friends but instead the policemen became victims themselves.

Film director Andrei Smirnov was picking actors for this film for a very long time. Thus, the role of the director of the plant Kharlamov was auditioned for by Mikhail Ulyanov and even Eldar Ryazanov. Nikolay Rybnikov wanted to play the role of the simple locksmith, but Yevgeny Leonov was stronger in the screen test. The character of accountant Dubinsky was conceived as an analogue to Aramis, who would be played by the "classic" intellectual – Innokenty Smoktunovsky or Nikolai Grinko. As a result, Andrei Smirnov chose Anatoly Papanov, who surprisingly combined softness and sentimentality with brutality and power.

Direction of Mosfilm approved Inna Makarova on the role of the nurse Raisa, but Andrei Smirnov insisted on the candidacy of Nina Urgant.

Music
The text of song for the movie, ("We need only one victory") was written by poet Bulat Okudzhava on request by director Andrei Smirnov. The music was also written by Okudzhava and adopted by Alfred Schnittke in the form of a march to be played at the military parades on Victory Day (9 May). During the filming of the finale Smirnov asked Nina Urgant not to cry when she sings. She managed to do it only after several attempts.

Cast
 Yevgeny Leonov as Ivan Prikhodko, locksmith, former military intelligence commander
 Anatoli Papanov as Nikolai I. Dubinsky, accountant, former military radioman
 Vsevolod Safonov as Aleksey K. Kirushin, journalist, a former miner
 Aleksey Glazyrin as Viktor S. Kharlamov, director of the plant, a former sapper
 Nina Urgant as Raisa, former nurse
 Raisa Kurkina as Lidia A. Matveeva, widow of the Valentin Matveev, former comrade-in-arms of main characters
 Lyubov Sokolova as Luba Prikhodko, Ivan Prikhodko's wife
 Nikifor Kolofidin as gen. Andrey A. Puhov, Lidia Matveeva's father
 Yuri Orlov as Vladimir Matveev, Lidia Matveeva's son
 Nikolai Volkov as director of the plant, Nikolai Dubinsky's chief
 Aleksandr Janvarjov as driver Sasha, owner of the car Moskvitch
 Margarita Terekhova as Natasha Shipilova, Sasha's girlfriend
 Valentina Anan'ina as Katya, housekeeper in Matveev family
 Ludmila Arinina as doctor
 Yuri Vizbor as Balashov, chief-engineer 
 Yuri Volyntsev as police sergeant
 Vladimir Grammatikov as Grisha, Kharlamov's driver
 Valeri Malyshev as police lieutenant
 Viktor Proskurin as Petr, Ivan Prikhodko's young colleague
 Elena Skachkova as Raisa's daughter

Awards 
 Award at the Karlovy Vary International Film Festival (1971)

References

External links

1971 films
1971 drama films
Soviet drama films
Russian drama films
Films scored by Alfred Schnittke
Films about accountants
1970s Russian-language films